Parkland Airport  is a registered aerodrome located  southeast of Spruce Grove in Parkland County, Alberta, Canada. It opened in November 2013, when the Edmonton City Centre Airport closed. The Edmonton Flying Club is located at the aerodrome.

According to a CTV News report from November 2013 the airport had the Transport Canada location identifier of CPL6. However, the aerodrome and code did not appear in the Canada Flight Supplement until April 3, 2014.

Runway
Although the Parkland Airport website has indicated, since 2016, that the runway is  the Canada Flight Supplement of 20 June 2019 indicates that the runway is still . As of 14 July 2019 there is no NOTAM to show that the runway has been extended.

Controversy
In September and October 2013 both Parkland County and neighbouring residents tried to stop the construction of the airport, but a judge ruled construction could continue as airports are under federal jurisdiction. In November 2013 the Enoch Cree Nation made a statement of claim that their rights were being harmed, and they were not consulted. On January 15, 2014, members of Enoch Cree Nation sought an injunction against operations at the airport.

See also
List of airports in the Edmonton Metropolitan Region

References 

Edmonton Metropolitan Region
Parkland County
Registered aerodromes in Alberta